Christian Nation is a 2013 alternate history novel by American author Frederic Rich. It was Rich's first published novel.

The book is set in a dystopian alternate timeline where John McCain defeats Barack Obama in the 2008 United States presidential election, and Sarah Palin takes over after McCain's death early in his term. Palin's presidency becomes increasingly authoritarian and eventually leads to a Dominionist insurgency and theocracy; the narrator of the book is a former lawyer who recounts the rise of the regime and resistance efforts, particularly by the state of New York.

References 

2013 fiction books
W. W. Norton & Company books
Dystopian novels
Political novels
Alternate history novels
Novels set in New York (state)
Cultural depictions of Sarah Palin